Drăgaica is the traditional Midsummer fair held annually in Buzău, Romania. It takes place every year between 10 and 24 June.

History
The Drăgaica fair was initially a wool trading fair held in the mountain side of the Buzău River valley, every year, after the sheep shearing. Eventually, the fair moved to Buzău, as shown by a document dated 26 August 1778 issued by Alexandru Ipsilanti by which full jurisdiction on the organization and the tax collection rights for the fair were granted to the Buzău bishopric.

Mihai Şuţu reinforced the bishopric's privileges on the collection of taxes from the fair in a 1792 letter:

In 1806, Buzău was burnt to the ground by the Ottoman army during the Russo-Turkish War of 1806-1812, and the city's inhabitants took refuge in the villages in the nearby hills. The fair was thus suspended until 1829, when it was resumed in a rebuilt Buzău.

The Drăgaica fair is still being held in Buzău, once a year, for two weeks, in June.

Notes

References

Buzău
Tourist attractions in Buzău County
Fairs in Romania
Festivals in Romania
June events
Summer events in Romania